The Episcopal Diocese of Easton is a diocese of the Episcopal Church in the United States of America that comprises the nine counties that make up the Eastern Shore of Maryland. It is in Province III (the Middle Atlantic region) and was created as a split from the Diocese of Maryland in 1868.

The diocese consists of the Eastern Shore of Maryland (the nine counties of Caroline, Cecil, Dorchester, Kent, Queen Anne's, Somerset, Talbot, Wicomico, and Worcester), and has a total membership of about 9,750 people, out of a total population of 420,792, according to a 2004 census estimate. There are 39 parishes and missions in the diocese. Its largest cities are Salisbury, Ocean City, and Easton, the centrally located city from which the diocese takes its name and where Trinity Cathedral, the bishop's seat, is located.  Camp Wright, the diocesan camp, is located in Stevensville.  Christ Episcopal Church of Kent Island, the oldest Christian congregation in Maryland, is a part of the diocese, and is also located in Stevensville.

Bishops
 1. Henry Champlin Lay, (1869–1885)
 2. William Forbes Adams, (1887-1920)
 3. George William Davenport, (1920-1938)
 4. William McClelland, (1939-1949)
 5. Allen Jerome Miller, (1949-1966)
 6. George Alfred Taylor, (1967-1975)
 7. William Moultrie Moore, Jr., (1975-1983)
 8. Elliott Lorenz Sorge, (1983-1993)
 9. Martin Gough Townsend, (1993-2001)
 10. James Joseph Shand, (2003-2014)
     Henry N. Parsley, Jr., Provisional Bishop (2014-2016)
 11. Santosh Kumar Marray, (2016-)

References

External links
The Episcopal Diocese of Easton
Journal of the Annual Convention, Diocese of Easton

Easton
Diocese of Easton
Religious organizations established in 1868
Anglican dioceses established in the 19th century
1868 establishments in Maryland
Eastern Shore of Maryland
Province 3 of the Episcopal Church (United States)